Addu may refer to:
Addu Atoll, a geographic atoll
Addu City, an  administrative city consisting of the inhabited islands of Addu Atoll